Jose "Jerry" Rizalino Larion Acuzar (born June 19, 1955)is a Filipino business executive who is the founder of New San Jose Builders. He also serves as the current Secretary of the Department of Human Settlements and Urban Development since July 29, 2022.

Early life and education
Jose "Jerry" Acuzar was born on June 19, 1955 in Balanga, Bataan. His parents were Marcelino A. Acuzar and Maria Larion.

He finished his primary education at the Balanga Elementary School in 1967 and completed his secondary education at the Arellano Memorial (Bataan) High School (now Bataan National High School) in 1974. He finished a vocational course in drafting at the Bataan National School of Arts and Trades (BNSAT) in Balanga (now the Bataan Peninsula State University). He obtained a college degree in architecture at the Technological Institute of the Philippines in 1983.

Career
While attending BNSAT, Acuzar worked as a cutter-welder in the iron works shop owned by his older brother. He would later set up his own iron works shop in Quezon City.

Acuzar also was employed as a draftsman for the Tondo Foreshore Redevelopment Project in 1975. He worked as a contractor in the 1980s before establishing the real estate firm New San Jose Builders, Inc. (NSJBI) in 1986. NSJBI is known for developing residential and commercial condominiums as well as the Philippine Arena.

He is also known for the development of the Las Casas Filipinas de Acuzar in Bataan, a resort known for its Spanish colonial-era buildings transplanted from elsewhere.

On July 29, 2022, Acuzar was appointed as secretary of the Department of Human Settlements and Urban Development by President Bongbong Marcos. He is the second secretary of the executive department, succeeding Eduardo del Rosario.

Personal life
Acuzar is married to Maria Theresa Ochoa, the sister of Paquito Ochoa Jr.

References

|-

1955 births
Filipino business executives
Filipino company founders
Filipino businesspeople in real estate
Bongbong Marcos administration cabinet members
Secretaries of Human Settlements and Urban Development of the Philippines
People from Balanga, Bataan
Living people